Deadwood Dick is a 1940 American Western Serial film directed by James W. Horne and starring Don Douglas and Lorna Gray. The character of Deadwood Dick was for the most part another version of "Zorro".

Plot
Deadwood Dick, a masked and mysterious hero, is in reality Dick Stanley, editor of the Dakota Pioneer Press and a leading member of Statehood For Dakota. He is on the trail of a masked villain known as the Skull, who leads a violent, renegade band infamous for its violence against the Deadwood residents' wishes for a statehood status. Our hero soon discovers that the Skull terrorizes the town to prevent statehood from being achieved in order to build his own empire in the vast territory. However, Dick suspects that one of his fellow committeemen might be responsible for the string of criminal acts. It takes him 15 episodes and about 40 choreographed slugfests to finally uncover the truth and defeat the Skull.

Cast
 Donald Douglas as Dick Stanley - aka Deadwood Dick (as Don Douglas)
 Lorna Gray as Anne Butler
 Harry Harvey as Dave Miller
 Marin Sais as Calamity Jane
 Lane Chandler as Wild Bill Hickok [Ch.1]
 Jack Ingram as Buzz Ricketts - Chief Henchman
 Charles King as Tex - Henchman [Chs. 1-4, 6-9]
 Ed Cassidy as Tennison Drew - Committeeman
 Robert Fiske as Ashton - Committeeman 
 Lee Shumway as Bentley - Committeeman

Chapter titles
 A Wild West Empire
 Who is the Skull?
 Pirates of the Plains
 The Skull Baits a Trap
 Win, Lose or Draw
 Buried Alive
 The Chariot of Doom
 The Secret of Number Ten
 The Fatal Warning
 Framed for Murder
 The Bucket of Death
 A Race Against Time
 The Arsenal of Revolt
 Holding the Fort
 The Deadwood Express

See also
 List of American films of 1940

References

External links
 
 

1940 films
1940 Western (genre) films
American black-and-white films
Columbia Pictures film serials
1940s English-language films
Films directed by James W. Horne
American Western (genre) films
Cultural depictions of Wild Bill Hickok
Cultural depictions of Calamity Jane
Films with screenplays by George H. Plympton
1940s American films